Nylink  is a non-profit, totally member-supported cooperative serving libraries and cultural heritage organizations of all types.  Based in Albany, New York, Nylink members are located in New York state and surrounding areas. Nylink's 300-plus member institutions include academic libraries, public libraries, library systems, corporate libraries, court libraries, government agency libraries, gardens, museums and other cultural heritage organizations.  Additionally, Nylink has more than 2,000 affiliate institutions who participate in or acquire services that Nylink offers.

Nylink announced in May, 2010, that the organization will phase out its operations over the next 12 months, with permanent closure planned for May 2011.  Steep declines in Nylink's revenue as a result of fundamental changes in its business environment have seriously degraded Nylink's ability to remain fully self-supporting. Nylink staff will continue to serve members through the coming year.

History
Nylink was founded in 1973 as the SUNY/OCLC Network, providing access and support to OCLC's core services (cataloging and resource sharing) for New York State libraries.  Nylink originated as one of fifteen regional service providers (RSPs) for OCLC, developed to provide personalized support for a suite of OCLC services.  In April 1999, the SUNY/OCLC Network changed its name to Nylink to reflect  its more diverse membership and services.

Nylink is governed by the Nylink Advisory Board, made up of representatives from all constituencies of Nylink members, elected by the membership.

Collaboration
Nylink's mission is "Supporting Libraries through Collaboration and Innovation.” Nylink accomplishes this through working with other NYS library organizations and other regional service providers, as well as working for libraries to provide training, support, and advocacy. 
2000: Nylink secured an IMLS grant to start Nylink's IT Fluency Institute.  The Fluency Institute developed into a year-round continuing education program.  Nylink's professional development  where information technology is only one component, is available to staff as face-to-face classes throughout New York, and anytime and anywhere as online classes.
2001: Nylink was a voting member of the NISO standard Z39.85-2001, “Dublin Core Metadata Standard”.  The Dublin Core metadata standard has become a mainstay in the library community to describe digital objects.
2006: Nylink and eleven other OCLC networks joined to form the Network Education Exchange (NEE) .  Through this agreement, Nylink members can take training classes at any other OCLC network at member rates.

Nylink has partnered with the Northeast Document Conservation Center, ENY/ACRL, the Eastern New York division of the Association of college and Research Libraries, the Association for Library Collections and Technical Services (ALCT), LITA, the Library and Information Technology Association, and many other organization to provide training for librarians and information professionals.

Nylink works with the New York State Library Association, participating on the conference program committee, NYLA sections and by supporting its annual conference as an exhibitor.

Nylink works with the New York State Higher Education Initiative (NYSHEI), recently negotiating an Elsevier contract for NYSHEI and Nylink to provide a substantial cost saving for New York libraries.

Nylink works with New York's 3Rs Councils (NY3R's)  to support NYS libraries, collaborating on training, providing access to databases, cataloging, and resource sharing.

Resource sharing across New York
LAND , a statewide ground delivery service for transporting materials between participating libraries, was created and is administered by Nylink.  For a flat annual rate, LAND participants can send and receive an unlimited number of items. LAND will remain available through December 2010.

In January 2004, Nylink began working with SUNY Geneseo to support the Information Delivery Service (IDS) pilot program.   The IDS Project is a cooperative resource sharing system designed to implement and evaluate a set of common transaction objectives, policies, and procedures among participating libraries that will help optimize mutual access to the information resources contained within those libraries.  The foundation of the project is based upon each participating library meeting the performance standards outlined in the IDS Project contract, using the OCLC ILLiad Resource Sharing Management System and the LAND Delivery System.  IDS has gained attention nationwide through the ATLAS ILLiad conferences.

Additional services
Nylink will continue to offer databases, E-book and journals, online encyclopedias, and other electronic resources to libraries at discounted rates for the next year. Nylink serves as the administrator on behalf of libraries, working with vendors, and providing the libraries with fiscal services and support.  Nylink also offers consulting services on a wide range of subject areas.

References

External links
Press release: Nylink to Wind Down Operations Over Next 12 Months
Nylink Closure FAQ
Alternative Providers for Nylink Services and Products
IDS Project

Non-profit organizations based in New York (state)
Organizations established in 1973
Cooperatives in the United States
Employee-owned companies of the United States
Library consortia in New York (state)
OCLC
Defunct organizations based in New York (state)
1973 establishments in New York (state)
2011 disestablishments in New York (state)
Organizations disestablished in 2011